Anna Martha Elizabeth Bruin (1870–1961) was a Dutch painter known for her landscapes.

Biography
Bruin was born on 24 September 1870 in Zaandijk. Her instructors included Jan Derk Huibers and Johannes Leendert Vleming. Bruin's work was included in the 1939 exhibition and sale Onze Kunst van Heden (Our Art of Today) at the Rijksmuseum in Amsterdam.

Bruin died on 24 June 1961 in Blaricum.

References

External links
images of Bruin's work on Artnet

1870 births
1961 deaths
19th-century Dutch women artists
20th-century Dutch women artists
People from Zaanstad
Dutch women painters